The 1974 Australian Grand Prix was a motor race held at Oran Park Raceway in New South Wales, Australia on 17 November 1974. It was open to Racing Cars complying with Australian Formula 1 or Australian Formula 2. The race, which was the thirty-ninth Australian Grand Prix, was Round Five of the 1974 Australian Drivers' Championship.

Australian driver Max Stewart won the race, ahead of John McCormack and Graeme Lawrence. It was Stewart's first Australian Grand Prix victory.

Classification 
Results were as follows:

Qualifying

Race

Notes 
Pole position: Max Stewart - 1'05.2
Fastest lap: Warwick Brown - 1'05.2, 146.3 km/h (90.9 mph), new outright record

Notes & references

Grand Prix
Australian Grand Prix
Formula 5000 race reports
Australian Grand Prix